Saint-Hippolyte is a municipality within La Rivière-du-Nord Regional County Municipality in the Laurentides region of Quebec, Canada, in the Laurentian mountains about 45 km north of Montreal. The name comes from Saint Hippolytus.

Part of the town was formerly known as Abercrombie-Est.

Police services are provided by the Régie intermunicipale de police de la Rivière-du-Nord, which also serves Piedmont, Prévost and some other communities in the Laurentians.

Origin of the name
The municipality of Saint-Hippolyte's original name was Abercrombie. The name was pick to honor James Abercrombie, british commander-in-chief of forces in North America during the French and Indian War, best known for the disastrous British losses in the 1758 Battle of Carillon. The municipality changed its name to the current Saint-Hippolyte in 1951. The name was chosen to honor Hippolyte Moreau, titular canon of the Cathedral of Montreal (1854-1880) and vicar general (1873-1880). It was his responsibility to choose the location of the church in the name of Monsignor Ignace Bourget in 1864. The name is a reference to Hippolytus of Rome, one of the most important second-third century Christian theologians.

Demographics
Population trend:
 Population in 2021: 10,669 (2016 to 2021 population change: 17.1%)
 Population in 2016: 9,113 
 Population in 2011: 8,083 
 Population in 2006: 7,219
 Population in 2001: 6,039
 Population in 1996: 5,672
 Population in 1991: 4,697

Private dwellings occupied by usual residents: 4,683 (total dwellings: 5,597)

Mother tongue:
 French as first language: 92.5%
 English as first language: 3.6%
 English and French as first language: 1.3%
 Other as first language: 2.4%

Climate
St Hippolyte has a warm-summer humid continental climate (Köppen climate classification: Dfb) with long, very cold winters, and short, mild summers. Days with temperatures below  all day are very frequent from November to March, with an average 95.7 days per year. The highest temperature on record in St Hippolyte is  set on 1 August 1975 and the lowest is  set on 23 February 1972.

Precipitation is heavy throughout the year. Heavy snow is commonplace throughout the winter, with heavy rain in the summer. On average,  of snow will be lying on 154.1 days per year, with a significant accumulation of over  lying on an average of 119.1 days per year. On average,  of rain falls on 179.0 days per year, with  falling on 6.7 days. Days of snowfall greater than  average at 20.3 days per year with days of snowfall greater than  average 0.79 days per year.

The average frost-free period is short, averaging only 138 days per year. The last frost, on average, occurs on 15 May and the first frost of the new season occurs on 30 September.

Education
The Commission scolaire de la Rivière-du-Nord operates French-language public schools.
École primaire des Hauteurs
 The primary school École des Hautbois in Saint-Colomban, Jean-Moreau in Sainte-Sophie and Sacré-Coeur in Saint-Jérôme serve sections
École secondaire Cap-Jeunesse and École secondaire des Hauts-Sommets in Saint-Jérôme

Sir Wilfrid Laurier School Board operates English-language public schools. Schools serving the town:
Morin Heights Elementary School in Morin-Heights serves a portion of the town
Laurentia Elementary School in Saint-Jérôme serves a portion of the town
Ste-Adèle Elementary School in Saint-Adèle serves a portion of the town
Laurentian Regional High School in Lachute

References

 Commission de toponymie du Quebec : Saint-Hippolyte
 Statistics Canada

External links

Municipalities in Quebec
Incorporated places in Laurentides